Legal process (sometimes simply process) is any formal notice or writ by a court obtaining jurisdiction over a person or property. Common forms of process include a summons, subpoena, mandate, and warrant.   Process normally takes effect by serving in on a person, arresting a person, posting it on real property, or seizing personal property.

See also
Civil procedure
Due process
Legal proceedings
Legal process outsourcing
Procedural law
Trial

References

Further reading
Hartzler, H. Richard (1976). Justice, Legal Systems, and Social Structure. Port Washington, NY: Kennikat Press.
Kempin, Jr., Frederick G. (1963). Legal History: Law and Social Change. Englewood Cliffs, NJ: Prentice-Hall.
Murphy, Cornelius F. (1977). Introduction to Law, Legal Process, and Procedure. St. Paul, MN: West Publishing.
Schwartz, Bernard (1974). The Law in America. New York: American Heritage Publishing Co.

Judiciaries
Legal procedure